Torpedo panthera also known as the leopard torpedo is a species of fish in the family Torpedinidae. It is found in Djibouti, Egypt, Eritrea, India, Iran, Oman, Pakistan, Saudi Arabia, Somalia, Sudan, and Yemen. Its natural habitat is open seas.

References

Torpedo (genus)
Fish of the Red Sea
Fish of the Persian Gulf
Vertebrates of the Arabian Peninsula
Taxa named by Ignaz von Olfers
Fish described in 1831
Taxonomy articles created by Polbot
Taxobox binomials not recognized by IUCN